The 7th Genie Awards were held March 20, 1986, at the Metro Toronto Convention Centre to honour achievements in Canadian film in 1985. The ceremony was co-hosted by Leslie Nielsen and Catherine Mary Stewart.

Nominees and winners

References

07
Genie
Genie